his is a list of films which have placed number one at the weekend box office in the Poland during 2011.

See also
 List of Polish films — Polish films by year

References

 

2011
2011 in Poland
Poland